Prechistino is a rural locality (a village) in Slednevskoye Rural Settlement, Alexandrovsky District, Vladimir Oblast, Russia. The population was 7 as of 2010.

Geography 
The village is located 14 km north-west from Slednevo, 21 km north-west from Alexandrov.

References 

Rural localities in Alexandrovsky District, Vladimir Oblast